The Civic Freedom Party was one of the two inter-war liberal parties in Hungary.

History
The party was founded in 1921 by Károly Rassay as the Independent Party of Smallholders, Workers and Citizens (FKFPP) as an attempt to mobilize voters for liberalism outside the cities. In the 1922 elections it ran alone, winning five seats, and also in alliance with the National Democratic Party, with the joint list winning seven seats.

For the 1926 elections it ran in alliance with the National Democratic Party under the name "United Left", winning nine seats.

Rassay reconstituted the party in 1930 as the National Liberal Party, as an attempt to build an alternative to the conservative government. In the 1931 elections it ran as the "Unified Liberal Democratic Party, winning four seats. The 1935 elections saw it run in alliance with the National Democratic Party again, this time under the name "Liberal and Democratic Opposition", with the alliance winning seven seats.

In the 1939 elections the party, now renamed the Civic Freedom Party, ran alone, winning five seats. In 1944 it was dissolved by the Communist Party. It was reformed as the Civic Democratic Party in 1945.

See also
Liberalism
Contributions to liberal theory
Liberalism worldwide
List of liberal parties
Liberal democracy
Liberalism and radicalism in Hungary

References

Liberal parties in Hungary
Hungary 1921
Defunct political parties in Hungary
Political parties established in 1921
Political parties disestablished in 1944
1921 establishments in Hungary
1944 disestablishments in Hungary